Moore/Carlew Building is a historic commercial building located at Huntington, Huntington County, Indiana.   It was built in 1844–1845, and is a two-story, Federal style brick building.  A three-story rear addition was constructed in 1860s.  It is one of the oldest buildings and the first brick structure constructed in Huntington.

It was listed on the National Register of Historic Places in 1983. It is located in the Huntington Courthouse Square Historic District.

References

Commercial buildings on the National Register of Historic Places in Indiana
Federal architecture in Indiana
Commercial buildings completed in 1845
Buildings and structures in Huntington County, Indiana
National Register of Historic Places in Huntington County, Indiana
Historic district contributing properties in Indiana